Viktoriya Potyekhina (born 14 May 1993 in Zaporizhia) is a Ukrainian diver. She competed in the 10 m platform synchronized event at the 2012 Summer Olympics with her partner Yulia Prokopchuk. A few months earlier, the pair won the silver medal at the 10 m synchro event of the European Aquatics Championships.

References 

1993 births
Living people
Divers at the 2012 Summer Olympics
Olympic divers of Ukraine
Ukrainian female divers
Sportspeople from Zaporizhzhia
Divers at the 2010 Summer Youth Olympics
21st-century Ukrainian women